Puch bei Hallein (Central Bavarian: Buach) is a municipality in the Hallein District (Tennengau) of the Austrian state of Salzburg.

Transportation
It can be reached by suburban S-Bahn railway from the state capital Salzburg and also has access to the  A 10 Tauern Autobahn (European route E55) from Salzburg to Villach.

History
The settlement was first mentioned as Puoche in a 930 deed, while the Puchstein Castle was already documented in 822. Main sight is the Baroque Urstein Palace, erected in 1691, now seat of a private academy. Puch is also a location of the Salzburg Fachhochschule (University of Applied Sciences).

References

Cities and towns in Hallein District